Tobias Pereira Figueiredo (born 2 February 1994) is a Portuguese professional footballer who plays as a central defender for EFL Championship club Hull City.

Formed at Sporting CP, where he made 30 first-team appearances, he had loans in Spain, Portugal and England before signing permanently for Nottingham Forest, where he played over 100 EFL Championship games.

Figueiredo earned 66 caps for Portugal at youth level, scoring seven goals. He was part of their team at the 2016 Olympics.

Club career

Sporting CP
Born in Sátão, Viseu District, Figueiredo joined Sporting CP's youth setup in 2006 at the age of 12, after starting out at S.C. Penalva do Castelo. He was promoted to the reserves in the summer of 2012, and made his professional debut on 11 August by starting in a 1–0 away loss against U.D. Oliveirense in the Segunda Liga.

On 29 January 2014, Figueiredo was loaned to Spanish club CF Reus Deportiu until June, alongside Sporting teammate Alexandre Guedes. An undisputed starter during his time in the Segunda División B, he returned to the Lions in June 2014 and was promoted to the main squad in January of the following year.

Figueiredo made his Primeira Liga debut on 18 January 2015, playing the full 90 minutes in a 4–2 home win against Rio Ave FC. He scored his first goal in the competition on 1 February, closing the 3–1 victory at F.C. Arouca. A month later, he added another in the first leg of the semi-finals of the Taça de Portugal against C.D. Nacional, as the latter tournament was eventually won with him as an unused substitute.

On 30 April 2015, Figueiredo extended his contract with Sporting until 2021. On 28 June of the following year, deemed surplus to requirements by manager Jorge Jesus, he was loaned to fellow league club Nacional. He scored his only goal in a 1–3 home loss to S.L. Benfica, as the season ended in relegation in last place.

Nottingham Forest
On 30 January 2018, completely ostracised by manager Jorge Jesus, Figueiredo signed on loan with English Championship club Nottingham Forest until the end of the campaign. He made his debut on 17 February, playing the entire 0–0 away draw against Burton Albion.

On 20 April 2018, it was announced that Figueiredo would join Forest on a permanent four-year deal on 1 July, for an undisclosed fee. He was sent off on 28 November in a 5–5 draw at Aston Villa, for a bad foul on John McGinn while winning 4–3. The day before the anniversary of that match, he scored his first goal in English football to open a 4–0 victory away to Queens Park Rangers from Joe Lolley's corner kick.

In January 2022, Figueiredo was tracked for a transfer to Vitória de Guimarães, first as a loan and later as a free transfer pending the termination of his Forest contract. The deal collapsed as the City Ground club did not submit the documentation on time. He did not feature in May's playoffs as the Reds ended their 23-year absence from the Premier League with a 1–0 final win over Huddersfield Town.

Figueiredo left on 30 June 2022 as his contract expired.

Hull City
On 28 June 2022, Figueiredo signed a two-year contract with Hull City, with the club holding an option for an extra year. He made his debut on 30 July, starting in the 2–1 home win against Bristol City.

International career
Figueiredo participated in two UEFA European Under-21 Championship editions with Portugal, playing twice in 2015 for the runners-up. He won his first cap at that level on 13 November 2014, in a 3–1 friendly defeat to England at Turf Moor.

Figueiredo was also picked by manager Rui Jorge for his squad that appeared at the 2016 Summer Olympics. He featured in all the matches in Rio de Janeiro, in an eventual quarter-final exit.

Personal life
Figueiredo's older brother, Cristiano, was also a footballer. He played his youth football with S.C. Braga.

Career statistics

Honours
Sporting CP
Taça de Portugal: 2014–15
Taça da Liga: 2017–18
Supertaça Cândido de Oliveira: 2015

Nottingham Forest
EFL Championship play-offs: 2022

References

External links

1994 births
Living people
People from Sátão
Sportspeople from Viseu District
Portuguese footballers
Association football defenders
Primeira Liga players
Liga Portugal 2 players
Sporting CP B players
Sporting CP footballers
C.D. Nacional players
Segunda División B players
CF Reus Deportiu players
English Football League players
Nottingham Forest F.C. players
Hull City A.F.C. players
Portugal youth international footballers
Portugal under-21 international footballers
Footballers at the 2016 Summer Olympics
Olympic footballers of Portugal
Portuguese expatriate footballers
Expatriate footballers in Spain
Expatriate footballers in England
Portuguese expatriate sportspeople in Spain
Portuguese expatriate sportspeople in England